The Port of Corpus Christi is the largest port in the United States in total revenue tonnage, third largest in total waterway tonnage, and is the largest crude oil export gateway in the nation. The Port of Corpus Christi is located on Corpus Christi Bay in the western Gulf of Mexico, with a 36-mile channel that is being widened and deepened to 54 feet MLLW from its current depth of 45 feet.

The Port of Corpus Christi’s headquarters, the Executive Administration Building, is located near the entrance the Inner Harbor (adjacent to Downtown Corpus Christi) in Nueces County. The Port operates as an independent subdivision of the State of Texas and is governed by state Navigation Code. The Port of Corpus Christi’s operations are funded without any city, county or state tax dollars.

Government 
The Port of Corpus Christi is governed by a seven-member Port Commission. Three port commissioners are appointed by the Nueces County Commissioners Court, three by the City of Corpus Christi and one by the San Patricio County Commissioners Court. The first port commission was appointed in 1923 with three members. They were Robert Driscoll (chairman), John W. Kellam of Robstown and W.W. Jones. In 1973, a special act of the legislature increased the number of commissioners to five, and in 1983, another special act of the legislature increased the number to seven. Environmental initiatives are handled through the Port of Corpus Christi’s Environmental Management System (EMS), while the Port of Corpus Christi Police Department oversees public safety and security within the Port’s footprint.

History 

The devastating Corpus Christi 1919 hurricane is ultimately what led to the creation of the Port of Corpus Christi. The storm left Corpus Christi heavily damaged, killing 280 and injuring thousands more on September 14, 1919. It also left buildings and homes in ruins. But its positioning on the cliffs where the city rested spared Corpus Christi from being entirely wiped out.

As the recovery from the 1919 hurricane began, efforts to establish a deep water port in Corpus Christi against the very high land that protected the city from full devastation started in earnest. Roy Miller – then-editor of the Corpus Christi Caller and future mayor of Corpus Christi – began the call for the establishment of a safe harbor in the city.

Three years later, after the voters in Nueces County gave their approval for the formation of Nueces County Navigation District No. 1, work began to build out the necessary infrastructure for the new port in Corpus Christi. The federal government allocated $5.1 million for the work, which paid for:

 A turning basin 1,200 feet wide by 3,000 feet long and 25 feet deep east of the city;

 Wharf construction, providing at first, for the berthing of seven vessels with ample provision for future expansion;

 Necessary mechanical equipment, fire protection, storage tracks and motor-truck roadways;
 Extension of partly constructed city breakwater in front of exposed face of the harbor;
 A lift bridge to carry the highway and the San Antonio and Aransas Pass railway track across the entrance channel;
 A levee between the harbor and Nueces Bay;
 A channel 200 feet wide and 25 feet deep, with widened places for passing, connecting the terminal with deep water at Port Aransas.

A statewide celebration was held in 1926 to officially open the Port of Corpus Christi for business. The first commodity to leave the Port was cotton from Aransas Compress Company. Ten years after the Port of Corpus Christi officially opened for operations, oil overtook cotton as the primary commodity moving through the gateway. By that time, the Port’s channel had been deepened to 32 feet to accommodate the growth in cargo volumes seen over that decade.

A new industrial canal, nearly two miles in length, and turning basin had been constructed a few years prior to accommodate the Port’s first industrial customer – Southern Alkali Corporation – in the first instance of lengthening the channel toward the west. And new lighting had been installed across the entire ship channel to adequately facilitate night navigation by vessels.

In subsequent years, the channel would see additional, incremental improvements to its depth and width, while the Port of Corpus Christi also continued its expansion westward. It added a new turning basin near Tule Lake, then another stretch of channel to what would become the Viola Turning Basin.

The Corpus Christi Ship Channel’s current depth of 45 feet was completed in 1990, 22 years after the project was authorized by Congress in 1968. Shortly after the 45-froot dredging project was finished, Congress gave authorization to further study improvements to the Corpus Christi Ship Channel, including the extension and deepening of the La Quinta Channel Extension. That work was authorized in the Water Resources and Development Act of 2007 and completed in 2013. As part of that 2007 authorization, Congress also set the new proposed depth of the Corpus Christi Ship Channel to 54 feet Mean Lower Low Water (MLLW).

The Port of Corpus Christi and U.S. Army Corps of Engineers entered into a Project Partnership Agreement on September 9, 2017 for construction of the main channel (widening and deepening), as well as new barge lanes. The Corpus Christi Ship Channel Improvement Project, once completed in 2023, will widen the channel to 530 feet and deepen it to 54 feet MLLW.

Cargo 
The Port of Corpus Christi in 2021 handled 6,843 vessels and over 167 million tons of cargo, the latter of which was a new monthly record in the Port’s history. The Port of Corpus Christi is the nation’s leading export gateway for crude oil and No. 2 gateway for exports of liquefied natural gas. The first export of crude oil to be shipped from the United States following the lifting of a federal ban on American crude in 2015 was from the Port of Corpus Christi.

That shipment was aboard the Theo T tanker, which carried crude oil overseas from NuStar Energy LP’s dockside facility in the Port of Corpus Christi. The Port of Corpus Christi, as of August 2022, holds roughly 60 percent of the U.S. crude oil market share.

In 2021, the top 5 commodities for the Port of Corpus Christi were:

Environmental 

The Port of Corpus Christi was the first port in Texas to achieve Green Marine certification in November 2016. It has since worked to maintain and expand its Green Marine certification at increasing levels annually, obtaining Level 5 in four different program areas, a Level 4 in two program areas, and a Level 3 in two program areas in 2021. It is pursuing Level 5 for eight of ten program areas by the year 2023.

The Port of Corpus Christi has voluntarily purchased electricity from 100% renewable sources since 2017 and has also been an Environmental Protection Agency Green Power Partner since 2021.

Since 2006, the Port of Corpus Christi has recycled a variety of materials, including: 1,266,122 pounds of paper, cardboard, and metal; 65,319 gallons of used oil and anti-freeze; and 18,188 electronic components and light bulbs.

The Port of Corpus Christi has been a strong supporter during the conversion of the Coastal Bend Air Quality Partnership (CBAQP) by contributing $270,000 over the next three years ($90,000 annually) in addition to other in-kind services like legal and office space. The Port of Corpus Christi also provided technical assistance with developing and implementing the CBAQP Strategic Plan, which includes development of an action plan to maintain and improve air quality in the region.

Other contributions by the Port of Corpus Christi include contributing $125,000 annually to the Texas A&M-Pollution Prevention Partnership for operation of the AutoCheck Program and other related outreach; contributing $165,000 annually to the Coastal Bend Bays and Estuaries Program for implementation of the Bays Plan; and undertaking an effort in partnership with Ducks Unlimited to identify, prioritize, permit and design beneficial reuse opportunities for dredge material.

Additionally, the Port of Corpus Christi is maintaining a trash skimming device in the Salt Flats Ditch to collect and monitor trash in rain runoff from urbanized areas that otherwise would have gone into Corpus Christi Bay. The trash skimmer was funded through an EPA Trash Free Waterways grant, with the program also including a trash awareness campaign to eliminate sources of trash in the runoff.

The Port of Corpus Christi is also campaigning to raise awareness and reduce litter at its Harbor Island property in cooperation with several local entities, including the City of Aransas Pass Code Enforcement and CBBEP Up2U campaign (also an EPA Trash Free Waterways funded project).

The Port of Corpus Christi is initiating a pilot program at its Avery Point Dock complex through a $1 million grant received in 2021 from the Texas Commission on Environmental Quality to identify emission control strategies for vessels at berth.

The Port of Corpus Christi is also in the midst of implementing a Clean Fleet Program to convert its vehicular fleet to electric/alternative fuels by 2023, as well as committing $2.5 million for construction of the Texas State Aquarium’s new Port of Corpus Christi Center for Wildlife Rescue. The Texas State Aquarium also pulls water for its exhibit directly from Corpus Christi Bay, a testament to the water quality the Port of Corpus Christi has long worked proactively to protect.

References 

Corpus Christi
Foreign trade zones of the United States
Transportation in Corpus Christi, Texas